Germain Gabriel Grisez (September 30, 1929 – February 1, 2018) was a French-American philosopher.  Grisez's development of ideas from Thomas Aquinas has redirected Catholic thought and changed the way it has engaged with secular moral philosophy. In 'The First Principle of Practical Reason: A Commentary on the Summa Theologiae, I-II, Q. 94, A. 2' (1965) Grisez attacked the neo-scholastic interpretation of Aquinas as holding that moral norms are derived from methodologically antecedent knowledge of human nature. Grisez defended the idea of metaphysical free choice, and proposed a natural law theory of practical reasoning and moral judgement which, although broadly Thomistic, departs from Aquinas on significant points.

Grisez was Professor of Christian Ethics at Mount St. Mary's University in Emmitsburg, MD from 1979 to his retirement in 2009.

See also
 John Finnis
 Robert P. George
 Pontifical Commission on Birth Control#Minority_report

References

External links
 The Way of the Lord Jesus Complete text of the three volumes and additional material
 The Making of a Moral Theologian, Russell Shaw. 1996 article on Grisez's personal and professional life, including his work for Cardinal O'Boyle of the Diocese of Washington D.C.
 Biotechnology and Human Dignity in the Thought of Germain Grisez, Nicholas C. Lund-Molfese.  Describes the necessity of the Christian virtue of hope in choosing the good of the human person in so-called "hard cases".
 INFALLIBILITY AND CONTRACEPTION: A REPLY TO GARTH HALLETT

1929 births
2018 deaths
American people of French descent
Catholic philosophers
21st-century American Roman Catholic theologians
Natural law ethicists